Sitonini is a tribe of weevils in the Entiminae subfamily. There are currently 9 extant genera, and one fossil genus, Sitonitellus.

References 

Entiminae
Beetle tribes